

Results - Elite

Results - Juniors

See also
 UCI Mountain Bike & Trials World Championships

References

 Official results

Downhill men